Tymal Solomon Mills (born 12 August 1992) is an English international cricketer who currently plays internationally for England and domestically for Sussex. He is a left-handed fast bowler and a right-handed batsman who plays mainly as a bowler. He made his international debut for England in July 2016.

Early life
Mills was born on 12 August 1992 in Dewsbury, West Yorkshire, England. He was educated at Mildenhall College of Technology in Mildenhall, Suffolk and played for Mildenhall Cricket Club. Mills studied sports journalism at the University of East London, before leaving to pursue a career in cricket.

Domestic career

Essex
Mills made his first-class debut for Essex against the Sri Lankans in the tourist match of 2011 at Chelmsford. He made his Championship debut against Leicestershire at Grace Road in July 2011. His figures in the first-innings were 0–51, but in the second innings, he took 3–48.
During the winter of 2011, Tymal Mills was named on the England Performance Programme (EPP). He began with training at Loughborough as well as camps in North Wales and with the Greater Manchester Fire Department. Mills then went to Potchefstroom, South Africa for three weeks in November on a specialist fast bowling programme. On Friday 16 December, Mills was a surprise inclusion in the 16 man England Lions squad. 
In 2012 Mills took 5 List A wickets and average of 58.60. He performed better in the Championship, taking 14 wickets at an average of 30.35. In 2013, his form in List A cricket improved, as he took ten wickets at an average of 23.30. However, he failed to kick on in the Championship, taking 11 wickets, three less than the previous season.
His performances for Essex earned him another place on an England performance programme, and he took six wickets for the Lions on their tour of Sri Lanka.

Sussex
In 2014, Mills joined Sussex. He took wickets at an average of 20 in the English T20 competition, and his pace ensured he continued to stand out. He also bowled in the First division of the County Championship for the first time, taking 14 wickets at an average of just below 35.
In 2015, he was diagnosed with a congenital back condition and as a result, took time out of playing red-ball cricket. He continued to play T20 cricket and took 19 wickets at an average of 18.84.

Overseas leagues

Pakistan Super League
From 2016, Mills played for Quetta Gladiators in the Pakistan Super League before signing with Karachi Kings in 2018. In 2019, he was picked by Peshawar Zalmi before returning to Quetta for the 2020 season.

Indian Premier League
This made him the second highest-paid overseas player in the 2017 IPL behind Ben Stokes. In February 2022, he was bought by the Mumbai Indians in the auction for the 2022 Indian Premier League tournament.

Other T20 franchise cricket
In September 2018, Mills was named in Kandahar's squad in the first edition of the Afghanistan Premier League tournament. In July 2019, he was selected to play for the Edinburgh Rocks in the inaugural edition of the Euro T20 Slam cricket tournament. However, the following month the tournament was cancelled.

Mills featured in the first edition of 'The Hundred', a 100 ball cricket competition for the 'Southern Brave'. The Southern Brave won the first cup/title of 'The Hundred' by beating Birmingham Phoenix in the finals. In April 2022, he was bought by the Southern Brave for the 2022 season of The Hundred.

International career
On 5 July 2016, Mills made his Twenty20 International (T20I) debut for England against Sri Lanka, taking figures of 0-22 as England won by eight wickets.

Mills was selected for the T20I series against India in January 2017. He took 1–27 in the first game as England recorded a seven-wicket victory. In the second match, he took figures of 1-36 as India made 144/8, which proved to be a winning score for India. In the final match of the series, he took figures of 1-31 and was then dismissed for a duck as England lost by 75 runs.

In September 2021, Mills was named in England's squad for the 2021 ICC Men's T20 World Cup. Mills made his international comeback for England after 5 years in their first match of the World Cup against West Indies and took 2-17 from his 4 overs.

Ventures Outside of Cricket

Pace Journal
In May 2020, he joined Pace Journal, a platform that inspires, educates and entertains fast bowlers and cricket fans around the world as an official partner. Speaking on his involvement, Mills stated that he had been following the channel for a while and the consistency and quality of content they produce gave him a lot of faith in their vision. He added that the prospect of being involved in a project which helps in giving back to the game, as well as supporting upcoming cricketers, is of huge interest to him.

By joining Pace Journal, Mills aims to advance their mission to create the most authentic, the most informed and the most diverse collection of insights, tips and experiences on fast bowling.

Personal life
Mills was diagnosed with a congenital back condition in 2015. He spent three months of the winter of 2020/21 recovering from a stress fracture and had to wear a back brace.

References

External links

1992 births
Living people
English cricketers
English cricketers of the 21st century
England Twenty20 International cricketers
Essex cricketers
Cricketers from Dewsbury
Black British sportspeople
Suffolk cricketers
Chattogram Challengers cricketers
Sussex cricketers
Auckland cricketers
Brisbane Heat cricketers
Quetta Gladiators cricketers
Royal Challengers Bangalore cricketers
Karachi Kings cricketers
World XI Twenty20 International cricketers
Kandahar Knights cricketers
Hobart Hurricanes cricketers
Peshawar Zalmi cricketers
Southern Brave cricketers
Perth Scorchers cricketers
Islamabad United cricketers